MigrantWatch is a citizen science non-governmental organisation project in India for collection of information about bird migration. The organisation was conceived in July 2007 and is coordinated by the Science Programme of the National Centre for Biological Sciences, in association with Indian Birds journal.

The goal of the MigrantWatch programme is to collect information on the arrival, presence and departure of migrant birds that spend the winter in India and to assess any changes that occur in the timing of migration. The MigrantWatch program provides a website where registered members can upload observations of migratory bird species, and access all the sighting records and maps with data plotted. 

In the first year, the program targeted nine species of migratory birds:

 Northern shoveller Anas clypeata
 Marsh harrier,\ Circus aeruginosus
 Wood sandpiper Tringa glareola
 Common (or barn) swallow Hirundo rustica
 Grey wagtail Motacilla cinerea
 Brown shrike Lanius cristatus
 Black redstart Phoenicurus ochruros
 Greenish warbler Phylloscopus trochiloides
 Rosy starling Sturnus roseus

Subsequently, the list was increased to 30 migratory species.

References

Non-profit organisations based in India
Environmental organisations based in India

Scientific organisations based in India
Nature conservation organisations based in India
Organizations established in 2007
Bird conservation organizations
Animal welfare organisations based in India